Hassan Al-Mohammed (born 2 August 1998) is a Saudi Arabian professional footballer who plays as a midfielder for Al-Fateh.

Career
Al-Mohammed began his career at the youth team of Al-Sawab. On 9 July 2015, Al-Mohammed joined Hajer. He signed his first professional contract with the club on 30 April 2018. He made his first-team debut during the 2019–20 season in the Saudi Second Division. He made 17 appearances and scored 3 goals as Hajer were crowned Second Division champions. On 17 September 2020, Al-Mohammed renewed his contract with Hajer for another three years. On 4 July 2021, Al-Mohammed joined Pro League side Al-Fateh on a five-year deal. He made his debut on 1 January 2022 in the league match against Al-Nassr.

Honours
Hajer
Saudi Second Division: 2019–20

References

External links 
 

1998 births
Living people
Saudi Arabian footballers
People from Al-Hasa
Association football midfielders
Al Omran Club players
Hajer FC players
Al-Fateh SC players
Saudi Second Division players
Saudi First Division League players
Saudi Professional League players